Marcussen is a surname. Notable people with the surname include:

 Hanna Elise Marcussen (born 1977), Norwegian politician 
 Ida Marcussen (born 1987), Norwegian heptathlete
 Jan Marcussen, American Seventh-day Adventist and former minister 
 Jens Marcussen (1926-2007), Norwegian politician
 Jørgen Marcussen (born 1950), Danish racing cyclist
 Peder Marcussen (1894-1972), Danish gymnast 
 Sigurd Marcussen (1905-2006), Norwegian politician
 Stephen Marcussen, chief mastering engineer

See also
 Marcussen & Søn, a Danish organ building company

Danish-language surnames
Norwegian-language surnames